The wedding dress of Katharine Worsley was worn at her wedding to Prince Edward, Duke of Kent, on 8 June 1961 at York Minster and was designed by Irish designer John Cavanagh.

The dress
The dress was designed by Irish designer John Cavanagh, chosen by Worsley on the advice of her future mother-in-law, Princess Marina. Cavanagh had designed for Princess Marina previously and had trained under Edward Molyneux, the designer of her own wedding gown in 1934.

The full skirt was covered at the back by a  double train. A few stitches at the hem of the gown were intentionally left unsewn due to the superstition that it is lucky to leave some part of a wedding dress unfinished.  

She wore a tulle veil and a diamond bandeau-style tiara which had belonged to her husband's late grandmother, Queen Mary. Queen Mary had purchased the piece from Garrard & Co in 1925. Three veils were made: one for rehearsals; one for the ceremony at York Minster; and an extra to be kept at Hovingham Hall for pictures.  

Both Worsley and Princess Marina were concerned that the dress appeared massive in Cavanagh's studio, he reassured them the scale would fit York Minster. There was also concern the dress was too heavy and would be awkward to manoeuvre. To overcome this, Worsley practiced walking, curtsying and kneeling in the dress with Cavanagh's help.

See also
 List of individual dresses

References

See also
 Katharine, Duchess of Kent
 Wedding of Prince Edward, Duke of Kent, and Katharine Worsley
 List of individual dresses

1960s fashion
1961 in England
British royal attire
English fashion
Marriage, unions and partnerships in England
Worsley, Katharine
1961 clothing